In 1579, Francis Drake was halfway during his circumnavigation and sailed out in the Pacific, then turned east
seeking the Strait of Anián (a water passage from the Pacific to the Atlantic, known in the reverse direction as the Northwest Passage),
or for a place to repair his ships.

After reaching land in Oregon, at the Oregon Dunes, near Coos Bay, Drake headed south, seeking a safe harbor.

Landing in California 
Like most early explorations, mainly Spaniards, Drake's harbor was not marked by a large, permanent marker that could be found by future visitors.  Instead, smaller pieces of physical and documentary evidence lead to the identity of Drake's landing site.  Scholars find uncertainty over Drake's landing site "a little strange since most of the voyage and layovers are described in such satisfying detail by Francis Fletcher."  The pieces of evidence include

Eleven keys
1.  The bay is within one-half degree (thirty nautical miles) of 38 degrees or 38 degrees, 30 minutes north latitude.

2.  The bay is in Coast Miwok territory.

3.  Islands of Saint James are not far without the bay.

4.  There is no strait leading into the continent, nor currents at sea
suggesting one.

5.  White banks and cliffs resemble counterparts along the English
Channel.

6.  The climate was cold, very foggy and windy from 27 June through 2
August (new style dates).

7.  The bay is the second in a charted sequence of two bays when
traveling south.

8.  Drake found the bay unexpectedly, as by godsend and "fell with"
a harbor within the bay.

9.  The bay faces south, with depths from six to eight fathoms
within a prominent point, diminishing gradually to three fathoms
on a course leading northeasterly into the bay toward an anchorage
off a river or estuary in the north end.

10.  A fertile and hospitable inland region contrasts sharply with
the barren, cold and foggy haven at the shore.

11.  Artifacts attributable to the Drake expedition are in Native-
American village sites.

Drake's Cove in Drakes Bay fits these criteria.

The three most important keys

Robert Allen recognizes three of these items as the keys that
identify the location of Drake's landing site:

1.  "A latitude of 38 degrees was given six times in contemporary
accounts as the latitude where Drake came ashore."  

2.  "Not farre without this harborough did lye certain lands (we
called them the Islands of Saint James)"   The only islands in the vicinity of
38 degrees north latitude are the Farallon Islands.  They are visible only as far north as Point Reyes.

Upon leaving his landing site, Drake was reported "from thence setting
his course southwest."

Working backwards, from the Farallon Islands, heading northeast, takes
one directly into Drakes Bay.

3.  "White bancks and cliffes, which lie toward the sea"   are prominent features of Drakes Bay.  The cliffs
face both south and west, "toward the sea."   These are similar to the white
cliffs of Dover along the English Channel, hence the name "Nova Albion."

Additional keys

Raymond Aker recognizes ten specific additional keys beyond the eleven, above:

12.  Agreement with the Dudley Charts

13.  A Fair and Good Bay

14.  Indian Houses Close by the Waterside

15.  No Choice of Havens

16.  Flora and Fauna

17.  Agreement with the Hondius Portus Novae Albionis Inset

18.  Indian Village Three Quarters of a Mile from Encampment

19.  Hills in Relation to Encampment

20.  The Nature of the Fort

21.  Relation of the Montanus Engraving.

Additional keys

22.  Further exploration of the area was a hike inland.

23.  The area is suitable to the requirements of careening and ship repair.

24.  There is abundant supply of stone for the fort's "bulwarks".

25.  The site is in the area of the first finding of the Plate of Brass.

26.  The area abounds in foods of the types mentioned in the contemporary accounts and offers an adequate supply of water and food.

27.  The cove area is sufficiently extensive to accommodate the expedition.

29.  The water visibility enabled the Indians, when they "chanced to see a fish so see a fish so neare the shoare that they might reach the place without swimming, they would never or very seldom miss to take it."

See also
 Fringe theories on the location of New Albion 
 Drake's Plate of Brass, a forgery of a plate purported to have been posted by Drake in California
 New Albion
 Drake Navigators Guild

References

External links
 Drake Navigators Guild 
 Drake's latitude determinations in California 

Pre-statehood history of California
Explorers of California
Exploration of North America
Francis Drake
1579 in North America
1579 in England
Expeditions from the Kingdom of England